The 2002 LG Cup was a professional snooker tournament held from 5 to 13 October 2002, at the Guild Hall, in Preston, Lancashire, England. It was the second year the event was known as the LG Cup and the 21st overall staging of the competition. Sponsored by the  Korean multinational conglomerate LG, the tournament was the first of eight World Professional Billiards and Snooker Association (WPBSA) ranking events in the 2002–03 snooker season and was televised in the United Kingdom on the BBC.

Chris Small, who has the spinal condition ankylosing spondylitis, was a 150/1 outsider when he won the tournament by defeating fellow Scot Alan McManus nine  to five (9–5) in the final. It was Small's only major ranking tournament title of his career as he retired from his disease three years later. In the semi-finals Small beat Jimmy Michie 6–2 and McManus defeated Steve Davis 6–2. Stephen Lee compiled the tournament's highest  of a 141  in his second round match against Ryan Day. The tournament preceded the second ranking event of the season, the British Open.

Background
The tournament was created as the Professional Players Tournament in 1982 by the snooker governing body, the World Professional Billiards and Snooker Association (WPBSA), to provide another ranking event. It was renamed the Grand Prix for the 1984 event until 2001, when it was called the LG Cup, before  reverting to the Grand Prix in 2004.

The 2002 tournament was held at the Guild Hall in Preston, Lancashire between 5 and 13 October. It was the first of eight WPBSA ranking events in the 2002–2003 season and the next event following last season's World Championship, which was won by Peter Ebdon. Stephen Lee won the 2001 LG Cup in a nine  to four victory (9–4) over Ebdon. The event preceded the second ranking tournament of the season, the British Open. Sponsored by the Korean multinational conglomerate LG for the second year in a row, it had a prize fund of £597,200, and was broadcast on the BBC. The maximum number of  contested in a match increased from nine in the first round to the quarter-finals to eleven in the semi-finals, leading up to the final, which was played as best-of-seventeen frames.

Prize money 
The breakdown of prize money for the 2002 tournament is shown below:

Winner: £82,500
Runner-up: £42,500
Semi-final (×2): £21,250
Quarter-final (×4): £11,700
Last 16 (×8): £9,600
Last 32 (×16): £7,800
Last 48 (×16): £4,000
Last 64 (×16): £3,150
Last 80 (×16): £2,150
Last 96 (×16): £1,450
Stage one highest break (×1): £1,800
Stage two highest break (×1): £7,500
Stage one maximum break: £5,000
Stage two maximum break: £20,000
Total: £597,200

Tournament summary

Qualifying
Qualifying for the event took place over four rounds which were played between 2 to 16 September 2007 at the Meadowside Centre, Burton upon Trent, for players on the main tour ranked 33 and lower for one of 32 places in the final stage. The successful qualifiers included the likes of Ryan Day, Shokat Ali, Ian McCulloch, Jimmy Michie, Robin Hull, Patrick Wallace and Jamie Burnett.

Last 48

The last 48 round occurred between 5 and 7 October, with the 16 qualifiers facing members of the top 32, but not including the top 16 seeds. Day, both the Snooker Writers Association and the World Snooker Newcomer of the Year, defeated Ali Carter 5–3. Anthony Davies made breaks of 84, 85 and 72 in his 5–0 whitewash of Marcus Campbell and would play world number 4 John Higgins in the next round. Ali, Pakistan's number one ranked player, compiled breaks of 64, 51, 95 and 98 in a 5–1 victory over John Parrott, the 1991 world champion. Fergal O'Brien edged out Nick Dyson 5–3, while Tony Drago and Gerard Greene defeated Gary Wilkinson and Dominic Dale respectively by the same scoreline.

Former World Matchplay champion James Wattana defeated Hull 5–4, coming from 4–0 behind to win four consecutive frames from breaks of 56, 51 and 43 to force a final frame decider. Wattana won it after Hull left a red ball in the jaws of a corner pocket. Michael Judge whitewashed David Finbow 5–0, a match in which Judge's highest break was 48 and Finbow conceded the fifth frame despite being 49 points behind with 59 remaining on the table. Six-time world champion Steve Davis achieved the competition's third whitewash with a 5–0 victory over the world number 46 Jamie Burnett to set up a match with fellow Londoner Jimmy White for the first time in a ranking tournament since the semi-finals of the 1995 International Open. World number 29 Chris Small, who suffers from the spinal condition ankylosing spondylitis, beat Mark Davis 5–2. Small led Mark Davis 4–0 until the latter took two frames in succession. Small claimed frame seven to win the match. Scottish Open runner-up David Gray won 5–1 against Atthasit Mahitthi, while Patrick Wallace came from 2–0 and 4–3 behind to beat Dave Harold 5–4 in a 4 hour, 34 minute game. That delayed Nigel Bond's match with Brian Morgan by two hours, which Bond won 5–1. In the last game of round one, Michie beat Marco Fu 5–1.

Last 32

The winners of the last 48 round qualified to face members of the top 16, which took place from 7 to 9 October. Day was defeated 5–4 by Lee, who achieved a 141  (the tournament's highest break) and Day compiled a 57 break to force a final frame decider. A break of 52 that commenced with a fluked  won Lee the match. Higgins whitewashed Davies 5–0 during which he missed an opportunity to achieve a maximum break in frame five, as he outscored Davies 361–75. Greene produced breaks of 61 and 78 in his 5–1 victory over world number 12 Graeme Dott. Ronnie O'Sullivan's breaks of 85, 56, 52 and 43 enabled him to beat Hamilton 5–2 in 85 minutes but expressed his displeasure at not achieving a sixth maximum break due to a lack of concentration. Ali missed a straightforward red ball while on 47 points in the opening frame of his 5–0 whitewash to McManus. Stephen Hendry, a seven-time world champion, opened his match with Drago by winning the first two frames. Drago made breaks of 32 and 36 to win frame three but Hendry won the next three with breaks of 52, 56 and 65 to win.

O'Brien led 2–0 with a break of 128 and his opponent Ebdon responded with a 101 break. Breaks of 103, 45 and 53 put Ebdon into the lead but O'Brien won the game 5–4 with victories in frame eight and the 41-minute ninth. In the match between Paul Hunter and Wattana, Hunter led 4–0 before Wattana won three successive frames. Hunter won frame eight and the match with a score of 91–8. Mark Williams led Judge 2–0 before Judge took three frames in a row to go 3–2 in front. Williams made a match-high break of 60 to win 5–3. White came from 3–1 behind to tie Davis at 3–3 with a break of 72. Both players shared the next two frames to force a final frame decider. Leading 49–16 with five un-potted red balls on the table, Davis fluked one of them and went on to produce a break of 21 to win the match that ran past midnight due to other fixtures running longer than expected.

On the second table, world number 16 Joe Perry lost 2–5 to Small despite the latter's heavy back strain. 1997 world champion and world number 5 Ken Doherty was the highest ranked player to lose in the round when Wallace beat him 5–3. Wallace dedicated the victory to his practice partner and former Northern Ireland Amateur Championship runner-up Barry McNamee who died when a car struck him that year. Joe Swail was another top 16 seed to be eliminated in round two when he lost 5–3 to Bond despite leading 3–1 midway through. Of the other two second round matches, Matthew Stevens lost 1–5 to Gray and Michie won 5–2 against the world number 11 Mark King.

Last 16

The last 16 round was played from 9 to 10 October. Lee led McManus 3–1 but the latter took four straight frames with a break of 105 to force a final frame decider. Lee missed the final  shot and he  the cue ball to give McManus the penalty points he required to return to contention and the latter made a 51 clearance to win 5–4. Greene took his fifth victory of the season when he beat O'Brien by the same scoreline. Small produced breaks of 58, 71 and 100 as he compiled 300 unanswered points against Higgins who won frame five to prevent a whitewash but Small took the sixth to claim a 5–1 victory. Holt took a 3–0 lead over O'Sullivan who responded to claim five consecutive frames for a 5–3 victory to avoid elimination.

Hunter led Hendry 3–1 with breaks of 112 and 66 and to 4–2 when Hendry achieved a 67 break in frame six before Hunter clinched the game 5–3 in a disjointed eighth frame. Michie edged out Wallace 5–4 to enter his first ranking professional tournament quarter-final since 1999. Similarly, Davis took the opening three frames of a match against Williams while the latter claimed frame four. Davis produced a run of 69 in frame five and he then compiled a match-winning 48 in the sixth frame for a final score of 5–1 in his favour. Davis remarked of his performance after the match, "It's the best I've played for years." In the final third round match Gray came from 4–2 behind to beat Bond 5–3.

Quarter-finals

The four quarter-finals were contested on 11 October. Small defeated O'Sullivan 5–1 to reach his first semi-final since the 1998 tournament. Small produced breaks of 81, 44, 71 and 137, which gave him a 4–0 lead at the mid-session interval. O'Sullivan prevented the first whitewash of his career since the 1997 China International with victory in a disjointed frame five but Small won the match with a 78 clearance in the sixth. Greene compiled breaks of 66 and 77 to lead Michie 2–0. After Michie won frame three, Greene took the following two to hold a 4–1 advantage. Michie responded with breaks of 66 and 98 to force a final frame decider, which he won on a long-range pink ball shot for a 5–4 scoreline.

Davis overcame Hunter 5–4 in a tightly contested match lasting 3 hours, 32 minutes. Coming from 3–0 and 4–2 behind, Davis made breaks of 47, 105 and 52 to bring the game to a final frame decider. With one red ball left on the table in frame nine, Hunter missed it five times from a snookered position and Davis accrued 21 points in fouls from Hunter. Davis won the 47-minute frame and the match with a score of 85–40. McManus defeated Gray 5–3 in a match which Gray's highest break was 98. McManus came from 3–1 down to produce breaks of 76, 94 and 46 and won the eighth frame to progress into his 35th career semi-final.

Semi-finals

The semi-finals on 12 October were best-of-11 frames. Small reached the first major ranking final of his career when he defeated Michie 6–2. Small won the first four frames, which included a 41-minute frame two that Michie lost because of a tight battle on the pink ball. Small produced a break of 77 in the third. After the mid-session interval, Michie won frames five and six but breaks of 36, 37, 43 and 39 won the match for Small, who commented on his delight to reach the final, "When I was a youngster I watched the snooker on television and thought how great it must be to play in a major final. Now I've done it at last and I'm determined to enjoy it. It's a dream come true and I can't wait."

The other semi-final saw McManus reach his 15th career final with a 6–4 victory over Davis in a match that lasted almost five hours. McManus won three frames on the pink ball and made breaks of 78, 50 and 76 to win the match. A male spectator was ejected from the Preston Guild Hall during frame eight for audible snoring and it was twice restarted because of separate safety shot stalemates. After the game, McManus called it "one of the hardest matches of my life" after he did not pot a single ball because of extended table play from Davis, "Halfway through I felt like a couldn't pot a ball so I'm pleased to have got through. I think it will be a different game in the final because Chris goes for his shots. It's a big match for both of us."

Final
The all-Scottish best-of-17 final happened on 13 October. McManus led 3–1 with successive breaks of 62 and 73. Small reduced McManus' lead by one frame with a half century break before McManus produced a 62 run to lead 4–2. Small produced a 69 break in frame seven and won the eighth to end the first session level at 4–4. When play resumed in the second session, a break of 62 from Small after McManus missed a mid-range red ball to a top corner pocket for the lead. More safety errors from McManus gave Small a chance to produce breaks of 47 and 27 in frame ten as the former did not record a single point in this period. McManus took the 11th frame after Small failed to pot the last red ball along the top . Small took the next three frames to win the match 9–5. The match lasted 6 hours and 13 minutes.  Aged 29 and a 150/1 outsider, he became the first non-top 16 ranked player to win a ranking tournament since O'Brien at the 1999 British Open.

It transpired to be the only ranking event victory of Small's career having retired from professional snooker three years later as a result of his affliction. Small earned £82,500 for the win. Post-match, Small dedicated his victory to his grandmother who died three years prior, "I held her hand in hospital the day before she died and when she asked me to win a tournament for her one day, I promised her I would. Now I've done it, so I just hope she was up there looking down and watching my victory." He also said it felt "like a dream", and would use the winnings to pay the mortgage on his house. McManus said he was pleased for Small and did not believe his game with Davis wore him out despite appearing visibly tired, "But from my point of view it was an anti-climax. It was not a great match but Chris was solid and if I left anything sticking out he knocked it in. But I'm delighted for him, he's a lovely lad and he deserves this victory after all he's been through."

The victory, according to Phil Yates of The Times, made Small possibly, "one of the most unlikely winners of a leading competition for years" because of his reputation of being a journeyman and him requiring monthly injections to reduce the effect of his spinal condition.

Main draw
The numbers in the box to the left of the player is their seeding. Players listed in bold denote a match winner. The draw for the main competition is shown below.

Final
Scores in bold denote all winning frame scores and the winning finalist. Breaks over 50 are shown in brackets.

Qualifying 
Players in bold denote a match winner.

Round 1 
Best of 9 frames

Round 2–4

References

World Open (snooker)
LG Cup
LG Cup (snooker)